Rattle is a quarterly poetry magazine founded in 1994, published in Los Angeles in the United States.

It publishes poems both by established writers, such as Philip Levine, Jane Hirshfield, Billy Collins, Sharon Olds, Gregory Orr, Patricia Smith, and Anis Mojgani, and by new and emerging poets. Poems from the magazine have been reprinted in The Best American Poetry and Pushcart Prize anthologies.

According to the magazine's website, "Rattle is pretty simple: We love poetry and feel that it's something everyone can enjoy. We look for poems that are accessible, that have heart, that have something to say."

Each issue is themed to honour a particular community of poets, such as teachers, slam poets, or, most recently, Los Angeles poets. Interviews with contemporary poets are also a staple. Though primarily dedicated to its print issues, the magazine's website also hosts other material, including audio archives and reviews of contemporary poetry.

The Rattle Chapbook Prize 
The Rattle Chapbook Prize has been awarded annually since 2016. It currently comprises three awards of $5,000, paid to the authors of the best chapbooks submitted. At least one of the awards is bestowed on a poet who has not previously published a full-length collection of poems. The winners so far have been:

The Rattle Poetry Prize 
The Rattle Poetry Prize has been awarded annually since 2006, and now comprises an award of $15,000 to the author of the best single poem submitted, as decided by the magazine's editors. Ten finalists also receive prizes, and one of them receives a Readers' Choice Award of $5,000. Winning poems are published in the magazine's winter issue.

Winners have included:

Rayon Lennon
 Sophia Rivkin
 Albert Haley
 Joseph Fasano
 Lynne Knight
 Patricia Smith
 Hayden Saunier
 Heidi Shuler
 Tiana Clark

Past contributors 
Past contributors have included:

 Jimmy Santiago Baca
 Amiri Baraka
 Marvin Bell
 Hayden Carruth
 Lucille Clifton
 Robert Creeley
 Paul Dickey
 Stephen Dobyns
 Mark Doty
 Denise Duhamel
 Sam Hamill
 Jane Hirshfield
 Mark Jarman
 Yusef Komunyakaa
 Li-Young Lee
 Philip Levine
 Anis Mojgani
 Naomi Shihab Nye
 Sharon Olds
 Elisha Porat
 Luis J. Rodriguez
 Alan Shapiro
 Charles Simic
 Patricia Smith
 Meghan Sterling
 Gerald Stern
 David St. John
 Brian Turner
 Diane Wakoski
 Anne Waldman
 C.K. Williams
 Taylor Mali
 Diana Goetsch

See also

 List of literary magazines
 List of United States magazines

Notes

External links 
 , the magazine's official website
 Rattle's description at NewPages
 Rattle's information at Duotrope
 Rattle's page at Poets & Writers

1994 establishments in California
Poetry magazines published in the United States
Quarterly magazines published in the United States
English-language magazines
Magazines established in 1994
Magazines published in Los Angeles